Judge Rives may refer to:

Alexander Rives (1806–1885), judge of the United States District Court for the Western District of Virginia
Jack L. Rives (born 1952), judge at the U.S. Air Force Court of Military Review
Richard Rives (1895–1982), judge of the United States Court of Appeals for the Fifth Circuit

See also
Rives Kistler (born 1949), justice of the Oregon Supreme Court
Camille L. Vélez-Rivé (born 1968), judge of the United States District Court for the District of Puerto Rico